For the Depeche Mode album, see Violator (album)

Violator: The Album is the first installment in the Violator hip hop compilations series. It was released on August 10, 1999 through Violator/Def Jam Recordings. It was the first release through the imprint Violator Records, a spin-off of Mona Scott & Chris Lighty's Violator Management company. A number of then-Violator Management clients and associates appear on the album, among them Q-Tip, Busta Rhymes, and Noreaga.

The LP features production from The Beatnuts, DJ Scratch, Diamond D, Havoc, Nottz, Q-Tip and Swizz Beatz, and featured Busta Rhymes, LL Cool J, Mobb Deep, Ja Rule, The Hot Boys and the first appearance of well-known Bronx rapper Mysonne. Violator proved to be a success, making it to #8 on the Billboard 200 and #1 on the Top R&B/Hip-Hop Albums, and spawned one sequel, Violator: The Album, V2.0, in 2001.  Q-Tip's "Vivrant Thing", the first solo single for the former A Tribe Called Quest member, was the album's first single and a major pop success. "Say What", by LL Cool J, was the album's second single.

The album was certified gold on September 29, 1999.

Track listing

Charts

Weekly charts

Year-end charts

See also
 List of Billboard number-one R&B albums of 1999

References

External links

1999 compilation albums
Albums produced by Nottz
Violator (company) albums
Hip hop compilation albums
Albums produced by Diamond D
Albums produced by DJ Scratch
Albums produced by Swizz Beatz
Albums produced by the Beatnuts
Record label compilation albums
Albums produced by Havoc (musician)
Albums produced by Q-Tip (musician)
Def Jam Recordings compilation albums
Albums produced by the Alchemist (musician)